James Wood is a British screenwriter.

Wood is perhaps best known for his writing on the BBC adaptation of Evelyn Waugh's Decline and Fall and as a writer and creator of Quacks. When asked how it felt to be the first to take on Waugh's classic novel, Wood replied: "It's a scary thing to do because it’s such a loved book. Lots of people think it's the greatest comic novel in English fiction. So that's the challenge - living up to expectations." Both Decline and Fall and Quacks were well received.

Wood won the 2012 BAFTA for Rev. under the category of Best Situation Comedy.

Filmography

Writing

References

External links 
 
  
James Wood at British Comedy Guide

BBC people
British male screenwriters
Living people
Year of birth missing (living people)